Criticism of libertarianism includes ethical, economic, environmental and pragmatic concerns and is often focused on right-libertarianism. Critics have argued that laissez-faire capitalism does not necessarily produce the best or most efficient outcome, and that libertarianism's philosophy of individualism and policies of deregulation fail to prevent the abuse of natural resources. Criticism of left-libertarianism is instead mainly related to anarchism and includes allegations of utopianism, tacit authoritarianism and vandalism towards feats of civilization. Left and right-libertarians also engage in criticism of each other.

Ethical criticism

Aggression and coercion 

The validity of right-libertarian notions of liberty and economic freedom have been questioned by critics such as Robert Lee Hale, who posits that laissez-faire capitalism is a system of aggressive coercion and restriction by property owners against others: Adam Smith's "obvious and simple system of natural liberty" is not a system of liberty at all, but a complicated network of restraints, imposed in part by individuals, but very largely by the government itself at the behest of others on the freedom of the "some". ... What in fact distinguishes this counterfeit system of "laissez-faire" (the market) from paternalism, is not the absence of restraint, but the absence of any conscious purpose of the part of the officials who administer the restraint, and of any responsibility or unanimity on the part of the numerous owners at whose discretion the restraint is administered.

Other critics, including John Rawls in Justice as Fairness, argue that implied social contracts justify government actions that violate the rights of some individuals as they are beneficial for society overall. This concept is related to philosophical collectivism as opposed to individualism. In response, libertarian philosophers such as Michael Huemer have raised criticisms of the social contract theory.

Authenticity of libertarian goals 

Critics such as Corey Robin describe right-libertarianism as fundamentally a reactionary conservative ideology united with more traditional conservative thought and goals by a desire to enforce hierarchical power and social relations: Conservatism, then, is not a commitment to limited government and liberty—or a wariness of change, a belief in evolutionary reform, or a politics of virtue. These may be the byproducts of conservatism, one or more of its historically specific and ever-changing modes of expression. But they are not its animating purpose. Neither is conservatism a makeshift fusion of capitalists, Christians, and warriors, for that fusion is impelled by a more elemental force—the opposition to the liberation of men and women from the fetters of their superiors, particularly in the private sphere. Such a view might seem miles away from the libertarian defense of the free market, with its celebration of the atomistic and autonomous individual. But it is not. When the libertarian looks out upon society, he does not see isolated individuals; he sees private, often hierarchical, groups, where a father governs his family and an owner his employees.

Will Moyer, a former libertarian, thought that Anarchism was the full realization of libertarianism. Political libertarianism was a distorted version of the philosophy, appealing solely to people who admired libertarianism's feelings but lacked the principle to follow it to its logical (and moral) consequences.

Property 
In his essay "From Liberty to Welfare", philosopher James P. Sterba argues that a morally consistent application of right-libertarian premises, including that of negative liberty, requires that a libertarian must endorse "the equality in the distribution of goods and resources required by a socialist state". Sterba presents the example of a typical conflict situation between the rich and poor "in order to see why libertarians are mistaken about what their ideal requires". He argues that such a situation is correctly seen as a conflict of negative liberties, saying that the right of the rich not to be interfered with in the satisfaction of their luxury needs is morally trumped by the right of the poor "not to be interfered with in taking from the surplus possessions of the rich what is necessary to satisfy their basic needs".

According to Sterba, the liberty of the poor should be morally prioritized in light of the fundamental ethical principle "ought implies can" from which it follows that it would be unreasonable to ask the poor to relinquish their liberty not be interfered with, noting that "in the extreme case it would involve asking or requiring the poor to sit back and starve to death" and that "by contrast it would not be unreasonable to ask and require the rich to sacrifice their liberty to meet some of their needs so that the poor can have the liberty to meet their basic needs". Having argued that "ought implies can" establishes the reasonability of asking the rich to sacrifice their luxuries for the basic needs of the poor, Sterba invokes a second fundamental principle, "The Conflict Resolution Principle", to argue that it is reasonable to make it an ethical requirement. He concludes by arguing that the application of these principles to the international context makes a compelling case for socialist distribution on a world scale.

Jeffrey Friedman argues that natural-rights libertarianism's justification for the primacy of property is incoherent: 

Philosopher Jonathan Wolff criticizes deontological libertarianism as incoherent, writing that it is incapable of explaining why harm suffered by the losers in economic competition does not violate the principle of self-ownership and that its advocates must "dishonestly smuggle" consequentialist arguments into their reasoning to justify the institution of the free market.

Robert Lee Hale has argued that the concept of coercion in right-libertarian theory is applied inconsistently, insofar as it is applied to government actions, but it is not applied to the coercive acts of property owners to preserve their own private property rights.

Standards of well-being 

Jeffrey Friedman has criticized right-libertarians for often relying on the unproven assumption that economic growth and affluence inevitably result in happiness and increased quality of life.

Theory of liberty 

J. C. Lester has argued that right-libertarianism has no explicit theory of liberty. He supplies a theory of liberty, briefly summarized as the absence of imposed cost. Frederick criticizes Lester for smuggling in concepts not specified in the theory. Lester responded. Both Lester and Frederick are proponents of critical rationalism, the epistemological approach of Karl Popper. Lester has criticized libertarians for neglecting epistemology.

Economic criticism 

Right-libertarians are accused of ignoring market failures, although not all proponents are market zealots. Critics of laissez-faire capitalism, the economic system favored by right-libertarians, argue that market failures justify government intervention in the economy, that nonintervention leads to monopolies and stifled innovation, or that unregulated markets are economically unstable. They argue that markets do not always produce the best or most efficient outcome, that redistribution of wealth can improve economic health and that humans involved in markets do not always act rationally.

Other economic criticisms concern the transition to a right-libertarian society. Jonathan Chait argues that privatizing Social Security would cause a fiscal crisis in the short-term and damage individuals' economic stability in the long-term.

Environmental criticism 

Reconciliation of individual rights and the advances of a free market economy with environmental degradation is a problem that few right-libertarians have addressed. Political scientist and author Charles Murray has written that stewardship is what private property owners do best. Environmentalists on the left who support regulations designed to reduce carbon emissions, such as cap and trade, argue that many right-libertarians currently have no method of dealing with problems like environmental degradation and natural resource depletion because of their rejection of regulation and collective control. They see natural resources as too difficult to privatize as well as legal responsibility for pollution or degrading biodiversity as too difficult to trace. As a result, some see the rise of right-libertarianism as popular political philosophy as partially responsible for climate change.

Right-libertarians are also criticised for ignoring observation and historical fact and instead focusing on an abstract ideal. Imperfection is not accounted for and they are axiomatically opposed to government initiatives to counter the effects of climate change.

Pragmatic criticism

Allegation of utopianism 
Anarchism is evaluated as unfeasible or utopian by its critics, often in general and formal debate. European history professor Carl Landauer argued that social anarchism is unrealistic and that government is a "lesser evil" than a society without "repressive force". He also argued that "ill intentions will cease if repressive force disappears" is an "absurdity". However, An Anarchist FAQ states the following: "Anarchy is not a utopia, [and] anarchists make no such claims about human perfection. ... Remaining disputes would be solved by reasonable methods, for example, the use of juries, mutual third parties, or community and workplace assemblies [as well as] some sort of "court" system would still be necessary to deal with the remaining crimes and to adjudicate disputes between citizens".

Government decentralization 

In his essay On Authority, Friedrich Engels claimed that radical decentralization promoted by anarchists would destroy modern industrial civilization, citing an example of railways: 

John Donahue also argues that if political power were radically shifted to local authorities, parochial local interests would predominate at the expense of the whole and that this would exacerbate current problems with collective action.

In the end, it is argued that authority in any form is a natural occurrence which should not be abolished.

Lack of contemporary examples 

In 2013, Michael Lind observed that of the 195 countries in the world, none have fully actualized a society as advocated by right-libertarians: 

Furthermore, Lind has criticized right-libertarianism as being incompatible with democracy and apologetic towards autocracy. In response, right-libertarian Warren Redlich argues that the United States "was extremely libertarian from the founding until 1860, and still very libertarian until roughly 1930".

Tacit authoritarianism 
The anarchist tendency known as platformism has been criticized by Situationists, insurrectionaries, synthesis anarchists and others of preserving tacitly statist, authoritarian or bureaucratic tendencies.

See also

References

Further reading

External links 
 
 Mike Huben's "Critiques of Libertarianism" (Wiki format)
 David D. Friedman's "Response to Mike Huben's Critiques of Libertarianism"

Controversies within libertarianism
Libertarian theory
Libertarianism